The Tamsui Lover's Bridge is a bridge in Tamsui Fisherman's Wharf, Tamsui District, New Taipei, Taiwan.

History
The bridge was opened on 14 February 2003.

Architecture
The shape of the white-colored bridge resembles the mast and rigging of a sailing ship. There are lamps illuminating the bridge at night.

See also
 Transportation in Taiwan

References

2003 establishments in Taiwan
Bridges completed in 2003
Bridges in New Taipei
Cable-stayed bridges in Taiwan